Loker may refer to:

Places
Loker, a village in Belgium

People with the surname
 John Loker (born 1938), contemporary British abstract painter
 Katherine Loker (1915–2008), American heiress and philanthropist
 Valerie Loker (born 1980), Canadian badminton player

Other uses
 Loker (Curonian king)
 Cromwell Field and Loker Stadium
 Loker Hydrocarbon Research Institute